Heerden Herman (born December 20, 1990, Pretoria) is a South African former Olympic freestyle swimmer. He trained at the Maties Swimming Club in Stellenbosch with Pierre de Roubaix. The first time the swimming fraternity took note of him was at the Western Province Championships in December 2005, when, as a 14-year-old, he broke the 800 meter freestyle open record.

In 2008 Heerden participated in the FINA World Junior Swimming Championships in Monterrey, Mexico where he won the gold in the 800 meter freestyle. At the 2010 Commonwealth Games in India he won the silver medal in the 1500 meter freestyle and as a member of the 4X200 meter freestyle relay team, they took the bronze.

At the Western Province Championships in December 2010, Heerden swam a time of 14:57.88 in the 1500 meter freestyle, breaking Ryk Neethling’s record and setting a new SA National Open record. With this swim he became the first South African, and the second swimmer from the African continent to finish the 1500m freestyle in less than 15 minutes. He ended the season being ranked number six in the world for the 1500 meter freestyle and under the top 20 in the world for both the 400m and 800m freestyle events.

Heerden was one of only a handful of swimmers to qualify for more than one event for the 2012 London Olympics – the 400 and 1500 meter freestyle events. Due to long-term illness he did not perform to his best at the Olympics and decided to retire. Heerden completed his university studies at Stellenbosch University with distinction at the end of 2013 and was awarded the Rhodes Scholarship to study at Oxford University from 2014.

See also
List of Commonwealth Games medallists in swimming (men)

References

1990 births
Living people
South African male swimmers
Olympic swimmers of South Africa
South African male freestyle swimmers
Swimmers at the 2012 Summer Olympics
Commonwealth Games medallists in swimming
Stellenbosch University alumni
Commonwealth Games silver medallists for South Africa
Commonwealth Games bronze medallists for South Africa
Swimmers at the 2010 Commonwealth Games
South African expatriates in the United Kingdom
People from Pretoria
Medallists at the 2010 Commonwealth Games